Transient execution CPU vulnerabilities are vulnerabilities in a computer system in which a speculative execution optimization implemented in a microprocessor is exploited to leak secret data to an unauthorized party. The classic example is Spectre that gave its name to this kind of side-channel attack, but since January 2018 many different vulnerabilities have been identified.

Overview 

Modern computers are highly parallel devices, composed of components with very different performance characteristics. If an operation (such as a branch) cannot yet be performed because some earlier slow operation (such as a memory read) has not yet completed, a microprocessor may attempt to predict the result of the earlier operation and execute the later operation speculatively, acting as if the prediction was correct. The prediction may be based on recent behavior of the system. When the earlier, slower operation completes, the microprocessor determines whether prediction was correct or incorrect. If it was correct then execution proceeds uninterrupted; if it was incorrect then the microprocessor rolls back the speculatively executed operations and repeats the original instruction with the real result of the slow operation. Specifically, a transient instruction refers to an instruction processed by error by the processor (incriminating the branch predictor in the case of Spectre) which can affect the micro-architectural state of the processor, leaving the architectural state without any trace of its execution.

In terms of the directly visible behavior of the computer it is as if the speculatively executed code "never happened". However, this speculative execution may affect the state of certain components of the microprocessor, such as the cache, and this effect may be discovered by careful monitoring of the timing of subsequent operations.

If an attacker can arrange that the speculatively executed code (which may be directly written by the attacker, or may be a suitable gadget that they have found in the targeted system) operates on secret data that they are unauthorized to access, and has a different effect on the cache for different values of the secret data, they may be able to discover the value of the secret data.

Starting in 2017, multiple examples of such vulnerabilities were identified, with publication starting in early 2018.

In March 2021 AMD security researchers discovered that the Predictive Store Forwarding algorithm in Zen 3 CPUs could be used by malicious applications to access data it shouldn't be accessing. According to Phoronix there's little impact in disabling the feature.

In June 2021, two new vulnerabilities, Speculative Code Store Bypass (SCSB, CVE-2021-0086) and Floating Point Value Injection (FPVI, CVE-2021-0089), affecting all modern x86-64 CPUs both from Intel and AMD were discovered. In order to mitigate them software has to be rewritten and recompiled. ARM CPUs are not affected by SCSB but some certain ARM architectures are affected by FPVI.

In August 2021 a vulnerability called "Transient Execution of Non-canonical Accesses" affecting certain AMD CPUs was disclosed. It requires the same mitigations as the MDS vulnerability affecting certain Intel CPUs. It was assigned CVE-2020-12965. Since most x86 software is already patched against MDS and this vulnerability has the exact same mitigations, software vendors don't have to address this vulnerability.

In October 2021 for the first time ever a vulnerability similar to Meltdown was disclosed to be affecting all AMD CPUs however the company doesn't think any new mitigations have to be applied and the existing ones are already sufficient.

In March 2022, a new variant of the Spectre vulnerability called Branch History Injection was disclosed. It affects certain ARM64 CPUs and the following Intel CPU families: Cascade Lake, Ice Lake, Tiger Lake and Alder Lake. According to Linux kernel developers AMD CPUs are also affected.

In March 2022, a vulnerability affecting a wide range of AMD CPUs was disclosed under CVE-2021-26341.

In June 2022, multiple MMIO Intel CPUs vulnerabilities related to execution in virtual environments were announced. The following CVEs were designated: CVE-2022-21123, CVE-2022-21125, CVE-2022-21166.

In July 2022, the Retbleed vulnerability was disclosed affecting Intel Core 6 to 8th generation CPUs and AMD Zen 1, 1+ and 2 generation CPUs. Newer Intel microarchitectures as well as AMD starting with Zen 3 are not affected. The mitigations for the vulnerability decrease the performance of the affected Intel CPUs by up to 39%, while AMD CPUs lose up to 14%.

In August 2022, the SQUIP vulnerability was disclosed affecting Ryzen 2000–5000 series CPUs. According to AMD the existing mitigations are enough to protect from it.

According to a Phoronix review released in October, 2022 Zen 4/Ryzen 7000 CPUs are not slowed down by mitigations, in fact disabling them leads to a performance loss.

In February 2023 a vulnerability affecting a wide range of AMD CPU architectures called "Cross-Thread Return Address Predictions" was disclosed.

Future 
Spectre class vulnerabilities will remain unfixed because otherwise CPU designers will have to disable speculative execution which will entail a massive performance loss. Despite this, AMD has managed to design Zen 4 such a way its performance is not affected by mitigations.

Vulnerabilities and mitigations summary 

Hardware mitigations require change to the CPU design and thus a new iteration of hardware, but impose close to zero performance loss. Microcode updates alter the software that the CPU runs on, requiring patches to be released and integrated into every operating system and for each CPU. OS/VMM mitigations are applied at the operating system or virtual machine level and (depending on workload) often incur quite a significant performance loss.  Software recompilation requires recompiling every piece of software and usually incur a severe performance hit.

The 8th generation Coffee Lake architecture in this table also applies to a wide range of previously released Intel CPUs, not limited to the architectures based on Intel Core, Pentium 4 and Intel Atom starting with Silvermont.  Various CPU microarchitectures not included above are also affected, among them are IBM Power, ARM, MIPS and others.

Intel CPUs past Ice Lake, e.g. Rocket Lake and Tiger Lake are not affected by Fallout/MSBDS.

Notes
1.Stepping 5 of the 2nd Generation Intel® Xeon® Scalable Processors based on Cascade Lake microarchitecture is affected by both MSBDS and MLPDS.

References

External links 
Linux kernel: Hardware vulnerabilities
Vulnerabilities associated with CPU speculative execution
A systematic evaluation of transient execution attacks and defenses
A dynamic tree of transient execution vulnerabilities for Intel, AMD and ARM CPUs
Transient Execution Attacks by Daniel Gruss, June 20, 2019
CPU Bugs
Intel: Refined Speculative Execution Terminology

Hardware bugs
Side-channel attacks